KNLW-LP (98.9 FM) is a radio station licensed to Rochester, Minnesota, United States.  The station is currently owned by Mercy Hill Church.

References

External links
KNLW - New Life 98.9 FM
New Life Worship Center
 

Low-power FM radio stations in Minnesota
Christian radio stations in Minnesota
Rochester, Minnesota